"Hey Hey Michael You're Really Fantastic" is a song by Rachel Stamp, released as the second single through WEA. It was released in August 1996 on three formats, CD Single, Limited Edition 12" vinyl of 1000 copies and cassette. A promotional video was also made to promote the release. The song is the only Rachel Stamp track to be released twice as a single, with a limited edition live version of the song being issued in 2000 during the band's "Hymns For Strange Children Tour" of the UK.

CD single, 12" vinyl and cassette
Released 5 August 1996
(WEA049CD/WEA049T/WEA049C 0630-14728-4)

Track listing
 "Hey Hey Michael You're Really Fantastic" (single edit)
 "Science Fiction"
 "n.a.u.s.e.a."

Facts 
 The second single through WEA
 Released on CD, Cassette and a Limited Edition Numbered 12” Vinyl of 1000 copies
 "Science Fiction" was frequently used to open shows at early Rachel Stamp gigs
 The recording of "n.a.u.s.e.a." features Jon Lee of Feeder, on backing vocals
 The tracks included on this single are also on the band's "Sweet Shop" compilation including a full length version of "Hey Hey Michael..."

"Hey Hey Michael..." promo CD single
Released August 1996
(WEA036CDDJ)

Track listing 
 Hey Hey Michael You're Really Fantastic (radio edit)

Facts 
 The promo single features an exclusive radio edit of the song

Promotional video

 The promotional video for "Hey Hey Michael..." was directed by Chris Williams
 David Ryder-Prangley: “Hey Hey Michael...” was directed by CHRIS WILLIAMS and camerawork by some bloke who did the PRODIGY 'firestarter' video... i almost got blinded by an ultraviolet light in a bit that didn't make it to the final cut. got shown maybe once on mtv and on Swedish TV. the guitars and bass we used in this video were stolen. they wouldn't let us have fire. i don't like it. (taken from a fansite interview, 2004)

Live version 

To promote the forthcoming release of Rachel Stamp's live album Stampax, the band released a limited edition CD single of "Hey Hey Michael You're Really Fantastic", recorded live during their "Hymns For Strange Children Tour" of the UK in 2000. The single also featured two live recordings of "I Got The Worm" and "Spank" as B-Sides that were not included on the album.

CD single 
Released 15 May 2000
(CR RS 004)

Track listing
 Hey Hey Michael You're Really Fantastic (live)
 I Got The Worm (live)
 Spank (live)

Facts 
 "Hey Hey Michael..." is the only Rachel Stamp single to be released twice: initially as a studio recording with the WEA line-up and then as a live single featuring the current foursome
 Released as a limited edition CD single of 1000 copies
 Artwork and design by Michael Corran. The artwork has a similar design to the original single release of "Hey Hey Michael You're Really Fantastic".
 All tracks were recorded live on the "Hymns For Strange Children Tour" of the UK in early 2000
 The recordings were mixed by Gareth Parton for this release. "Hey Hey Michael..." was remixed by Max Bisgrove for inclusion on the "Stampax" album.

References
 http://www.angelfire.com/magic/rachelstampdisco/images/newdisco2.html The Rachel Stamp Discography
 https://web.archive.org/web/20040114171024/http://www.rachelstamp.com/music/discog_hhmyrfl.html The Official Rachel Stamp website, retrieved via archive.org
 Rachel Stamp Videography

External links
Hey Hey Michael You're Really Fantastic Promo Video on YouTube
Hey Hey Michael You're Really Fantastic Promo Video on Facebook

1996 singles
Rachel Stamp songs
2000 singles
Song recordings produced by Dave Eringa
1996 songs
Warner Music Group singles